Kyebambe Girls Secondary School is a residential girls-only secondary school located in Fort Portal, Kabarole District in western Uganda. It was founded in 1910 under the Church of Uganda and named after the Omukama of Toro, Daudi Kasagama Kyebambe IV.

Location
The school is situated a distance of approximately 2 Kilometres from the heart of Fort Portal town which is approximately 290 kilometres from Kampala, the capital and largest city of Uganda.

Academics
Subjects offered at "O" Level include; Biology, Chemistry, Christian Religious Education, Commerce, Computer Studies, English Language and Literature, Fine Art, French, Geography, History, Mathematics, and Physics.

At "A" Level subjects offered are categorised into Arts and Sciences. 
The Arts subjects offered are; History, Economics, Divinity, French, Literature in English, Geography, Computer Studies and Fine Art. 
The Science subjects offered are Physics, Chemistry, Mathematics, Biology, Subsidiary Mathematics and General Paper which is compulsory.

Notable alumni
 Princess Elizabeth of Toro
 Jane Kaberuka, writer of fiction and autobiography, and senior civil servant
 Barbara Kaija, Editor-In-Chief, Vision Group
 Joy Doreen Biira, Journalist and media personality.

References

External links 
"O-levels: best and worst in 3 years "
"Museveni promises to build houses for teachers"
"Tooro Kingdom Mourns Passing of Princess"

Christian schools in Uganda
Boarding schools in Uganda
Educational institutions established in 1910
Girls' schools in Uganda
Kabarole District
Kumusha
1910 establishments in Uganda